Alūksne district was an administrative division of Latvia, located in Vidzeme region, in the country's north-east,  from the capital city Riga. The district had international borders with Estonia (border 103.8 km/64.35 miles) and Russia (border 46.4 km/28.77 miles), and internal borders with the districts of Valka (51.7 km/32.05 miles), Gulbene (98.1 km/60.83 miles) and Balvi (57.4 km/35.58 miles). The main city in the district was Alūksne.

After the administrative-territorial reform of 2009 the Alūksne District was divided between Alūksne Municipality and Ape Municipality.

Cities and parishes in the Alūksne District

 Alūksne town
 Ape town
 Alsviķi parish
 Anna parish
 Gaujiena parish
 Ilzene parish
 Jaunalūksne parish
 Jaunanna parish
 Jaunlaicene parish
 Kalncempji parish
 Liepna parish
 Maliena parish
 Mālupe parish
 Mārkalne parish
 Pededze parish
 Trapene parish
 Veclaicene parish
 Vireši parish
 Zeltiņi parish
 Ziemeri parish

References

Districts of Latvia